CD66 may refer to:

 Carcinoembryonic antigen, cluster of differentiation
 CargoNet CD66, a diesel locomotive